Poliosia brunnea is a moth in the family Erebidae. It was described by Frederic Moore in 1878. It is found in the Indian states of Sikkim and Assam.

References

Moths described in 1878
Lithosiina